Striker is a Bengali sports drama film directed by Archan Chakravarty. The film was based on a same name novel by Moti Nandi and released on 25 August 1978 under the banner of Keya films.

Plot
The film tells the story of a young footballer Prasun's life and his struggle to make a mark in Kolkata football. His father was also an eminent footballer but deprived by his club authority. Prasun has a dream to play on behalf of a big football club of Kolkata maidan.

Cast
 Samit Bhanja as Prasun
 Anil Chatterjee
 Santu Mukherjee
 Tarun Kumar Chatterjee
 Ruma Guha Thakurta
 Utpal Dutt
 Chinmoy Roy
 Arati Bhattacharya
 Ramen Raychowdhury
 Pinaki Sengupta

References

External links
 

1978 films
Bengali-language Indian films
1970s sports drama films
1970s Bengali-language films
Films set in Kolkata
Indian association football films
Films based on Indian novels
Indian sports drama films